Beth Nielsen Chapman is the second album by singer-songwriter Beth Nielsen Chapman.

Track listing
All tracks composed by Beth Nielsen Chapman; except where indicated
"Life Holds On"
"No System for Love"
"I Keep Coming Back to You" (Chapman, William Lloyd)
"Walk My Way" (Chapman, David Austin)
"All I Have" (Chapman, Eric Kaz)
"Child Again"
"Take It as It Comes"
"Down on My Knees"
"Avalanche"
"That's the Easy Part"
"Emily"
"Years"

Personnel
Beth Nielsen Chapman – vocals, acoustic guitar, piano, keyboards
Bill Hinds, Bill Lloyd, Dean Parks, David Grissom, John Themis, Steve Gibson, Mitchell Watkins, Michael Landau, John Willis – guitar
Mark Casstevens – mandolin, acoustic guitar
Michael Rhodes, Leland Sklar, Paul Powell, Glenn Worf, Roscoe Beck, Craig Nelson, Edgar Meyer, Dee Murray – bass
Sneaky Pete Kleinow – pedal steel
John Barlow Jarvis, Randy Kerber, Matt Rollings – piano
Phil Naish, Larry Steelman, Judd Miller – synthesizer
David Collard – keyboards
Paul Leim, Russ Kunkel – drums
Tom Roady, Lenny Castro, Danny Cummings, Paulinho da Costa – percussion
T. Nick Charles – triangle
Joel Derouin – violin
Bobby Taylor – oboe
David Austin – drum programming
Arnold McCuller, Bill Champlin, Tommy Funderbunk – backing vocals
Nick DeCaro – string arranger, conductor
Bruce Dukov – concertmaster
John Casado – design, photography

Charts

References

Beth Nielsen Chapman albums
Reprise Records albums
Albums produced by Jim Ed Norman
1990 albums